Françoise Lake is a freshwater body of the southern part of Eeyou Istchee James Bay (municipality), in the administrative region of Nord-du-Québec, in the province of Quebec, in Canada. The area of Lac Françoise extends into the townships of Grandis and du Guesclin, in the territory of the Eeyou Istchee James Bay (municipality), southwest of Chapais, Quebec.

Forestry is the main economic activity of the sector. Recreational tourism activities come second with a navigable body of water of  length, including Father Lake (South); Doda Lake (Southeast). This last lake is formed by an enlargement of the Opawica River.

This peninsula is surrounded to the north by Lake Du Guesclin and Lac Françoise; to the East and to the South by Doda Lake; Southwest, by Father Lake (Doda Lake tributary).

The surface of Lac Francoise is generally frozen from early November to mid-May, however, safe ice circulation is generally from mid-November to mid-April.

Geography

Toponymy
The term "Françoise" is a name of French origin.

The toponym "lake Françoise" was formalized on July 15, 1970, by the Commission de toponymie du Québec when it was created.

Notes and references

See also 

Eeyou Istchee James Bay
Lakes of Nord-du-Québec
Nottaway River drainage basin